Dennis Charles Berry (August 11, 1944 – June 12, 2021) was an American-French film director, actor, and screenwriter. He was the son of director John Berry.

Selected filmography
 La Collectionneuse (actor, 1967)
 Paulina Is Leaving – Paulina s'en va (actor, 1969)
 Promise at Dawn (actor, 1970)
 Borsalino (actor, 1970)
 The Big Delirium (director, 1975)
 Last Song (director, 1987)
 Chloé (director, 1996)
 Stargate SG-1 (director, 1997)
 Highlander: The Raven (director, 1998)
 Adventure Inc. (director 2 episodes, 2003)
  Mata Hari (director, 2016 TV series)

References

External links

1944 births
2021 deaths
Film directors from Los Angeles
American male film actors
American male screenwriters
American people of Polish-Jewish descent
American people of Romanian descent
Male actors from Hollywood, Los Angeles
Screenwriters from California